Acleris kochiella is a moth of the family Tortricidae. It is found in most of Europe, Kazakhstan, the Ural region, Irkutsk and China.

The wingspan is 15–18 mm. Adults are on the wing from June to July and in September.  There are two generations per year.

The larvae feed on Ulmus species. They feed on folded or spun leaves.

External links
 UKmoths

kochiella
Tortricidae of Europe
Moths of Asia
Moths described in 1783